Arthur C. Norman is a British computer scientist, and Fellow of Trinity College, Cambridge, where he has previously been a Director of Studies for Computer Science.

Education
Awarded a distinction in computer science in 1970.

Teaching
Norman delivered his last lecture at the Computer Laboratory on 3 December 2008  but his notes are still used as teaching resources.  The Trinity College Science Society often has Dr. Norman back for talks.

Publications
 Norman, A. and Cattell, G. 1983. "LISP on the B. B. C. Microcomputer" AcornSoft, Cambridge, England.
 Matooane, M. and Norman, A "A Parallel Symbolic Computation Environment: Structures and Mechanics." Euro-Par 1999: 1492-1495
 Norman, A. and Fitch, J "CABAL: polynomial and power series algebra on a parallel computer." PASCO 1997: 196-203
 Norman, A. and Fitch, J. "Interfacing REDUCE to Java." DISCO 1996: 271-276
 Norman, A. and Fitch, J. "Memory Tracing of Algebraic Calculations." ISSAC 1996: 113-119

References

External links
 Arthur Norman Fanclub
 "The Function of Faster Programming", New Scientist, 25 November 1982
Dedication in Harvey, M. 2000 "Multithreading - The Delphi Way"

Year of birth missing (living people)
Living people
British computer scientists
Fellows of Trinity College, Cambridge